Nara Bhupal Shah (1697–1743) was a king of the Gorkha Kingdom, which lies in modern day Nepal; and the father of Prithvi Narayan Shah. Nara Bhupal Shah was the son of Birbhadra Shah, the grandson of Prithvipati Shah. He was the king of the Gorkha state in Nepal. He tried to extend his kingdom by capturing Nuwakot, but he failed. After his death, his eldest son, Prithvi Narayan Shah, completed the annexation of Nuwakot and even the Kathmandu Valley, in his conquest of unified Nepal.

References

Gurkhas
1743 deaths
1697 births
18th-century monarchs in Asia
People of the Nepalese unification
People from Gorkha District
18th-century Nepalese people
17th-century Nepalese people
Nepalese Hindus